Lagerstroemia tomentosa is a species of flowering plant in the family Lythraceae. It is found in Indochina, including in Yunnan, Vietnam, Laos, Thailand, and Cambodia.

References

tomentosa
Trees of Thailand
Trees of Cambodia
Trees of Laos
Trees of Vietnam
Flora of Yunnan
Trees of Indo-China